Haldan may refer to:

People
Haldan Keffer Hartline, an American physiologist,
Paul Haldan, a Romanian-born Dutch professional table tennis player.
Halfdan, a legendary Swedish or Danish king

Fictional characters